Dawidy may refer to the following villages in Poland:
 Dawidy, Lublin Voivodeship (east Poland)
 Dawidy, Łosice County in Masovian Voivodeship (east-central Poland)
 Dawidy, Pruszków County in Masovian Voivodeship (east-central Poland)
 Dawidy, Warmian-Masurian Voivodeship (north-east Poland)

See also: Dawidy Bankowe